David Parks may refer to:
David Parks (politician) (born 1943), state senator from Nevada
David Parks (photographer) (born 1944), American photographer, film director, publicist, and author
Dave Parks (born 1941), American football player

See also
David Parkes (disambiguation)
David Park (disambiguation)